Winfrida Dominic is a Tanzanian model and beauty pageant titleholder who was crowned Miss Universe Tanzania 2012 and represented her country at the 2012 Miss Universe. She was also supposed to represent Tanzania in Miss Supranational pageant but withdrew at the last moment due to not being able to secure a Visa for Poland.

Miss Universe Tanzania 2012 & Miss Universe 2012

Winfrida Dominic won the crown of Miss Universe Tanzania 2012 at the National Museum Hall in Dar es Salaam on Friday night 29 June 2012. Bahati Chando won the Miss Earth Tanzania 2012 title and Dorice Mollel won the Miss Tourism Queen International Tanzania 2012 title.

References

External links
 Official Miss Tanzania website

1993 births
Living people
Miss Universe 2012 contestants
Tanzanian female models
Tanzanian beauty pageant winners